The Balasahebanchi Shiv Sena was a Hindu nationalist political party in India formed in 2022 and dissolved in 2023 under the leadership of Eknath Shinde, as a result of a split in the Shiv Sena. After the split, the Election Commission of India (ECI) allotted the party a new symbol as the main Shiv Sena's symbol was frozen. 
On 17 February 2023, the ECI granted the Balasahebanchi Shiv Sena the party name and symbol, the Shiv Sena and the Bow and Arrow, respectively.

On 17 February 2023, the ECI granted this party, 'Bow and Arrow' symbol and party name 'Shivsena', after a lengthy hearing. Uddhav Thackeray filed a petition against the decision at Supreme court, expressing his feeling that the ECI decision was wrong.

Formation 
Balasahebanchi Shivsena was formed after a split in the Shiv Sena party due to an uprising led by Eknath Shinde, who had the support of the majority of the party's MLAs. The split was caused by Shinde's disagreement with Uddhav Thackeray's decision to continue with the Maha Vikas Aghadi coalition, despite Shinde and the majority of the party's MLAs requesting a break from the coalition. The split led to both factions claiming ownership of Shiv Sena. The Election Commission intervened and asked both factions to come up with new party names until the issue was resolved, resulting in the formation of Balasahebanchi Shiv Sena. Meanwhile, Uddhav Thackeray formed his faction as Shiv Sena (Uddhav Balasaheb Thackeray).

Leaders

Chief Minister

Electoral performance 
The first face off between Balasahebanchi Shiv Sena and Shiv Sena (Uddhav Balasaheb Thackeray) was in 2022 Maharashtra Gram Panchayat Polls where Maha Vikas Aghadi won 457 gram panchayat seats while Mahayuti won 397 seats. The Shiv Sena (Uddhav Balasaheb Thackeray) won 153 seats and Balasahebanchi Shiv Sena won 113 seats.

References

External links 

2022 establishments in Maharashtra
Political parties in India
Political parties established in 2022
Political parties disestablished in 2023
Shiv Sena
Conservative parties in India